Hypotrisula is a monotypic moth genus of the family Erebidae erected by George Hampson in 1926. Its only species, Hypotrisula boarmioides, was first described by Francis Walker in 1865. It is found in northern India.

References

Calpinae
Monotypic moth genera